Najm al-Din, also transliterated Najm ad-Din, Najmuddin, etc., is a male given name of Arabic origin, formed from Najm and al-Din, meaning "star of the religion". It may refer to:

People
Najm al-Din Ayyub (died 1173), Kurdish soldier, father of Saladin
Najm al-Din al-Khabushani (1116–1191), Persian Shafi'i jurist
Najmuddin Kubra (1145–1221), Persian Sufi philosopher
Najm al-Din Razi (1177–1256), Persian Sufi philosopher
Al-Malik as-Salih Najm al-Din Ayyub, or just As-Salih Ayyub (c. 1205–1249), Ayyubid ruler of Egypt
Najm al-Dīn al-Qazwīnī al-Kātibī (died 1276), Persian Islamic philosopher and logician of the Shafi`i school
Najm al-Din Mahmud ibn Ilyas al-Shirazi (died 1330), Persian physician
Najimuddin Ali Khan (1750–1766), Nawab of Bengal
Jumeken Najimedenov (1935–1983), Kazakh composer
Najmuddin Shaikh (born 1939), Pakistani diplomat
Najmaldin Karim (1949-2020), Governor of Kirkuk Province
Najmuddin Faraj Ahmad, known as Mullah Krekar (born 1956), exiled Kurdish politician
Najmadin Shukr Rauf (1957–1985), Kurdish soldier
Suzan Najm Aldeen (born 1966), Syrian actress
Nagmeldin Ali Abubakr (born 1986), Sudanese athlete
Najm Eldin Abdullah (born 1987), Sudanese footballer
Najmiddin Jalolov (died 2009?), Uzbek Islamic fighter
Najmuddin Khan, Pakistani politician

Places
Mazraeh-ye Khodaqoli Najam ol Din, village in Iran

See also
Necmettin

Arabic masculine given names